The Canon R lens mount is a physical standard for connecting a camera lens to a 35mm single-lens reflex camera body. It was introduced in March 1959 along with the Canon Canonflex.

The R mount was used on Canon's first single lens reflex (SLR) camera. The mount employed a "breech lock" system to attach the lens to the camera body.

The R mount was discontinued in 1964 and replaced with the Canon FL lens mount.
Many mirrorless interchangeable-lens cameras are able to use Canon R lenses via an adapter.
The mechanism for controlling the aperture is different from both the later FL and FD mount, although they physically still can mate with most adapters.

R cameras 
 Canon Canonflex (1959)
 Canon Canonflex R2000 (1960)
 Canon Canonflex RP (1960)
 Canon Canonflex RM (1962)

R lenses
Source:

Zoom 
 55-135mm f/3.5 (1963)

Wide-angle (under 50mm) 
 35mm f/2.5 (1960)

Standard (50–60mm) 
 50mm f/1.8 I (1959)
 50mm f/1.8 II (1960)
 50mm f/1.8 III (1963)
 58mm f/1.2 (1962)

Telephoto (above 60mm) 
 85mm f/1.8 (1961)
 85mm f/1.9 (1960)
 100mm f/2 (1959)
 100mm f/3.5 I (1961)
 100mm f/3.5 II (1963)
 135mm f/2.5 (1960)
 135mm f/3.5 I (1959)
 135mm f/3.5 II (1961)
 200mm f/3.5 (1959)
 300mm f/4 (1960)
 400mm f/4.5 (1960)
 600mm f/5.6 (1960)
 800mm f/8 (1960)
 1000mm f/11 (1960)
 2000mm f/11 (1960)

References 

Lens mounts
Canon R cameras